Henrik Galeen (7 January 1881 – 30 July 1949) was an Austrian-born actor, screenwriter and film director considered an influential figure in the development of German Expressionist cinema during the silent era.

Early years
Considerable mystery exists about Galeen's early life, and for many years it was uncertain where exactly he was born. Galeen came from a Jewish family in Lemberg, Galicia, which was then part of the Austrian Empire. He moved from Austria to Germany before the First World War, and became assistant to the leading theatre figure Max Reinhardt. Galeen subsequently became an actor in Berlin and touring other German-speaking cities.

German silent films
Galeen first became involved in film in 1913 when he worked on the screenplays for several uncredited films. In 1914 he wrote, directed and acted in The Golem the first of several depictions of the mythical figure The Golem. Following the First World War, he went to work for a branch of the major German studio UFA. He worked as a screenwriter on films such as Ruth's Two Husbands (1919) and Waxworks (1924).

In 1922 he was engaged to write a version of Dracula, but wrongly believing it to be in copyright, he changed the name to Nosferatu (1922). The film has come to be regarded as a classic of German expressionist cinema and along with two of his later films, The Student of Prague (1926) and Alraune (1928), serves as the basis for Galeen's high reputation. He also worked on a number of less-remembered films including a series of thrillers starring Harry Piel.

Later career
From 1928 to 1931 he lived in Britain, where he directed a feature film After the Verdict (1928) which was the first film to be shot at Wimbledon. He also worked on a number of short films. He returned to Germany in 1931 and directed a final film there The House of Dora Green (1933). Following the Nazi Party's rise to power in 1933, Galeen went into exile in Sweden before moving on to the United Kingdom and eventually to the United States. He died in Vermont in 1949, at age 68.

Selected filmography

References

Sources
 Isenberg, Noah William. Weimar Cinema: An Essential Guide to Classic Films of the Era. Columbia University Press, 2009.
 Bock, Hans-Michael & Bergfelder, Tim. The Concise CineGraph. Encyclopedia of German Cinema. Berghahn Books, 2009.

External links
 

1881 births
1949 deaths
Austrian male screenwriters
Austrian film directors
Austrian male stage actors
Austrian male silent film actors
Austrian Jews
Film people from Lviv
Jewish emigrants from Nazi Germany to the United States
20th-century Austrian male actors
20th-century Austrian screenwriters
20th-century Austrian male writers
Austro-Hungarian emigrants to Germany